Cave Springs Cowboy Camp was a line camp operated by the Scorup-Sommerville Cattle Company in what would become Canyonlands National Park, Utah. The site consists of a cave-like shelter under a rock overhang on the side of a small canyon. The canyon was arranged with a fence across the opening that allowed its use as a cattle pen. The site contains a great deal of material that was abandoned as the site became disused. The shelter was used from the late 1890s through the late 1960s when the park was established.

See also
 Lost Canyon Cowboy Camp

References

National Register of Historic Places in Canyonlands National Park
National Register of Historic Places in San Juan County, Utah